Reckless burning is a crime that involves illegally setting fire to something not of building proportions, such as leaves or trash. It is a lesser charge than arson. It is usually enacted and levied in areas of high fire risk to prevent people from starting fires that could easily get out of control.

See also 
 Vandalism
 Arson
 Pyromania

References

Crimes
Fire